Lauren is a feminine given name and a surname. It may also refer to:

 Lauren (perfume), a Ralph Lauren fragrance
 Lauren (EP) (2016), by Keke Palmer
 Lauren Engineers & Constructors
 Penn, North Dakota, also known as Lauren, an unincorporated community
 Lauren (footballer), Cameroonian retired footballer Laureano Bisan Etamé-Mayer (born 1977)

See also
 Laure (disambiguation)
 Laureen
 Laurene (disambiguation)
 Laurens (disambiguation)
 Laurent (disambiguation)
 Loren (disambiguation)